Buckleya is an Asian and American genus of hemiparasitic shrubs in the sandalwood family.
It is named for Samuel Botsford Buckley. Buckleya is also known as Piratebush. Plants of this species are dioecious, meaning they are either bear either male and female flowers.

Species
Buckleya angulosa S.B.Zhou & X.H.Guo – eastern China
Buckleya distichophylla (Nutt.) Torr. – southeastern United States
Buckleya graebneriana Diels – central China 
Buckleya lanceolata (Siebold & Zucc.) Miq. – Japan, China

References

Santalaceae
Santalales genera
Parasitic plants
Dioecious plants